Breno Gonçalves Lopes (born 28 September 1990), known as Breno Lopes, is a Brazilian professional footballer who plays as a left-back for Ituano.

Honours
Cruzeiro
 Campeonato Brasileiro Série A: 2014

References

External links
 

1990 births
Living people
Brazilian footballers
Association football defenders
Campeonato Brasileiro Série A players
Campeonato Brasileiro Série B players
Campeonato Brasileiro Série D players
Brasília Futebol Clube players
Ceilândia Esporte Clube players
Paraná Clube players
Cruzeiro Esporte Clube players
Fluminense FC players
Red Bull Brasil players
Associação Atlética Ponte Preta players
Atlético Clube Goianiense players
Ituano FC players